Haeberle or Häberle is a German surname. Notable people with the surname include:

Erwin J. Haeberle (1936–2021), German sexologist
Peter Häberle (born 1934), German legal scholar
Ronald L. Haeberle (born c. 1940), American photographer

German-language surnames